The Bulletin of the British Ornithologists' Club is an ornithological journal published by the British Ornithologists' Club (BOC). It is cited as Bull. B. O. C.

Many descriptions of birds new to science have been published in the bulletin.

The journal was first published in 1892. It is published in four quarterly issues. from March 2017 (Vol. 137 No. 1), it became an online-only, open access, journal, giving as the reasons for the change:

Since 2004, the journal's honorary editor has been Guy Kirwan.

List of editors
List of Bulletin Editors with dates of tenure 

 Richard Bowdler Sharpe 1892–1904
 W. R. Ogilvie-Grant 1904–1914
 David Armitage Bannerman 1914–1915
 D. Seth-Smith 1915–1920
 Percy R. Lowe 1920–1925
 Norman B. Kinnear 1925–1930
 G. Carmichael Low 1930–1935 and 1940–1945
 C. H. B. Grant 1935–1940 and 1947–1952
 W. P. C. Tenison 1945–1947
 J. G. Harrison 1952–1961
 J.J. Yealland 1962–1969
 C.W. Benson 1969–1974
 Hugh Elliott 1974–1975
 J.F. Monk 1976–1990
 D.W. Snow 1991–1997
 C.J. Feare 1997–2003
 G.M. Kirwan 2004–

See also
List of ornithology journals

References

External links 
 Bulletin of the British Ornithologists' Club, volumes 1–136 (1892–2016) in Biodiversity Heritage Library (accessed 2022-05-31)

Journals and magazines relating to birding and ornithology
1892 establishments in the United Kingdom
Publications established in 1892
Ornithology in the United Kingdom
Open access journals
Online-only journals